Clubiona rosserae, or Rosser's sac spider, is a rare species of sac spider native to wetlands of Great Britain.  Though once feared to be extinct, a colony was discovered in 2010 at Chippenham Fen in Cambridgeshire. It can also be found at the Cavenham-Icklingham Heaths Site of Special Scientific Interest (SSSI) in north Suffolk.

References

Clubionidae
Spiders of Europe
Spiders described in 1953